Tom Scheffel (born 20 September 1994) is a German footballer who currently plays as a midfielder for VSG Altglienicke.

Career
Scheffel came through Chemnitzer FC's youth team, and was promoted to the first team in 2013. He made his 3. Liga debut in August 2013, as a substitute for Kolja Pusch in a 5–3 win over Jahn Regensburg.

External links
 Profile at Soccerway
 

Living people
1994 births
Sportspeople from Chemnitz
Association football midfielders
German footballers
Chemnitzer FC players
Wormatia Worms players
VSG Altglienicke players
3. Liga players
Regionalliga players
Footballers from Saxony